"Heaven on Earth" is a song by Australian contemporary worship band Planetshakers. It was released on October 12, 2018, as the lead single from their live album, Heaven on Earth (2018). The song was written by Joth Hunt, Samantha Evans and Andy Harrison. It appeared on the EP Heaven on Earth, Part 3.

Background
"Heaven on Earth", produced by Bryan Fowler (TobyMac, Chris Tomlin) and Micah Kuiper, was released on October 12, 2018, to streaming and digital retail platforms and added on AC and radio CHR. After adding the song to the radio it became Billboard's No. 1 most-added song on the USA Hot AC / CHR radio charts for two consecutive weeks.

Music videos
The official music video for the song was released on October 18, 2018 and has garnered over 658 thousand views as of January 2021.

Charts

Year-end charts

Release history

References

2018 singles
2018 songs
Christian songs
Gospel songs
Contemporary Christian songs
Songs written by Joth Hunt
Planetshakers songs
Planetshakers Ministries International singles